Acanthocobitis (Paracanthocobitis) mandalayensis also known as the Mandalay zipper loach is a species of ray-finned fish in the genus, or subgenus, Paracanthocobitis. This species is known from the Irrawaddy drainage of northeastern Myanmar, Sittang basin of southern Myanmar, and the Wang and Ping rivers in the Chao Phraya River basin of northwestern Thailand.

References

mandalayensis
Fish described in 1948